Meat Machine were a rock band active during the first half of the 1990s.

History

Meat Machine was founded in 1990 by Vincent James, the group's frontman and principal songwriter & Ford Shawcross, who later left the band in 1992 (He died in 2009.) Keyboard programmer, John Clarke (who later was one third of the Music Production team JKL; Who produced 2-step garage music acts such as MC Neat) was with Meat Machine from 1990 to 1991. John also contributed Additional Programmer work to several tracks on the Slug Album.

After record deal discussions with More Protein; A record label started by Boy George (who expressed considerable interest in signing the band), Meat Machine opted instead to sign with Kickin Records / Pandemonium Records in 1991; Releasing their Debut Single, Times Of Addiction / Nightmare in early 1992. Their debut LP Slug (recorded throughout  1992) was released in 1993; Co-Produced by Ralph Ruppert (aka Ralph 'P' Ruppert.)

American, Keyboard programmer, Steven Von Kampen joined the band in 1991 & along with Vincent James, Co-Composed most of the songs on the Slug Album. Guitarist Tony Stone (who joined in 1992) also contributed to writing on the Slug Album (inc. their 2nd Single); Although he left the group before the Album's release in 1993. Tony Stone later released several other records inc. Bio Static Systems Kommando Unit EP (1996).

Alastair Symons, Ex-Guitarist for The Lords of the New Church also contributed Guitar work to the Slug Album. Richard Kaltenhauser (who later formed Machine Rox in 2007) & Guitarist Pierre Xavier; Both French born, joined the band to assist in performing the Album live on the Slug Tour during late 1993 through early 1994. Mark Price (musician) Ex-Drummer for All About Eve (band) & later The Cure replaced Mike Patterson on Drums, during 1994 on the Slug Tour.

In early 1994, Whilst Meat Machine were recording songs for their follow up second album, they split with Kickin Records & immediately commenced negotiations for a second Album record deal with the US & German Record Company Century Media Records. Also at this time the band were negotiating an Artist Management deal with Tim Collins at MIM / Mission Impossible Management (Whose stable of artists included Siouxsie & the Banshees, The Cure & The Pogues amongst others.) In May 1994, Meat Machine were approached to Support Nine Inch Nails on the UK & European leg of their Self-Destruct Tour, taking over from Marilyn Manson & Hole (band) Who played the USA stage of the tour. Whilst these negotiations were taking place, the band Meat Machine acrimoniously split-up, due to fierce in-fighting disagreements. Each band member then went their own way.

Steven Von Kampen returned to the US and began working in the videogames industry as a Sound Designer; Creating soundtracks for games inc. Star Trek Deep Space 9 & Buffy the Vampire Slayer amongst others. Later moving on to composing music for (Short) films inc. No Menus Please (2006), iGod (2009) & the award-winning short film, Tu & Eu (2011); For which Steven Von Kampen was nominated for, Best Music Soundtrack at the Music Film Festival in Germany (2011) & Won the Best Original Score at the Williamsberg International Film Festival (2014) & was also the Bronze Winner for the Global Music Awards (2015).

Between 2000 & 2002, under the name of Meat Machine, Vincent James (aka Vince St. James) recorded a further Album, entitled Tripping Over Shadows which was released on MM Records Inc. This Album included 2 (previously unreleased) songs Co-Written with Steven Von Kampen.

March/April 2003—Japanese Gothic rock band Buck-Tick, Used various songs from Meat Machine's Slug Album on their 17 date Mona Lisa Overdrive (album) Tour & also the first date of their Here we go again! Tour at the close of April, playing to over 40,000 people across Japan.
Buck-Tick's Guitarist, Songwriter & founding member, Hisashi Imai, named Meat  Machine's Slug Album as being one of his favorite/influential albums.

Between 1988-1989, Before forming Meat Machine, Vincent James was signed to Tim Palmer's Beggars Banquet Records / City Beat Label (which was the precursor to XL Recordings) as a solo artist; Recording a 12-inch House Music Single (at Strongroom Recording Studios in Shoreditch) under the name of Vince James Project feat. J Rose; Co-Produced by Stephen W. Tayler (Sigue Sigue Sputnik & Kate Bush et al.) & Engineered by Neil McLellan (The Prodigy). The Single was later remixed at Madness (band) owned Liquidator Studios, by Rex Brough (aka King John and the Red King) who also produced songs on both Bomb The Bass & Betty Boo debut albums for the Rhythm King label.

Further reading
 May 16, 1992 – Melody Maker (Interview)
 July 24, 1993 – Kerrang! Magazine (Single of the Week)
 August 28, 1993 – Kerrang! Magazine (Concert Review) 
 October 23, 1993 - Kerrang! Magazine (Album review) 
 January 29, 1994 – Kerrang! Magazine (Interview)

References

External links
 
 
 
 
 
 
 
 

Musical groups established in 1990